Endogenous risk  is a type of Financial risk  that is created by the interaction of market participants. It was proposed by Jon Danielsson and Hyun-Song Shin in 2002.

Risk can be classified into the two categories of exogenous and endogenous risk. Under exogenous risk,  shocks to the financial system arrived from outside the system, like an asteroid might hit the earth. Market participants react to the shock but do not influence it. By contrast, with endogenous risk,  the interaction of market participants, each with their own abilities, biases, prejudices and resources, results in most market outcomes and all large outcomes. In particular, systemic risk is a form of endogenous risk.

As a practical interpretation of endogenous risk when applied to risk measurements, it can be further subdivided into actual risk,  the underlying latent risk and perceived risk,  what is reported by common risk measurement techniques, such as Value at risk  and Expected shortfall. Shown in the figure on the right,  as  a financial asset enters into a bubble state,  followed by a crash —  up by the escalator,  down by the lift —  perceived risk, what is reported by typical risk measures, falls as the bubble builds up, sharply increasing after the bubble deflates. By contrast, actual risk increases along with the bubble, falling at the same time the bubble bursts. Perceived risk and actual risk are negatively correlated.

See also
Supply chain network risk analysis

References 

Financial risk